Regency Square Mall may refer to:

Regency Square Mall (Jacksonville, Florida)
Florence Mall, Florence, Alabama, formerly known as Regency Square Mall